"I Close My Eyes and Count to Ten" is a song written by Clive Westlake and recorded by British singer Dusty Springfield. Recorded on 1 June 1968 at Chappel Studios in London, "I Close My Eyes..." was released that August to reach No. 4 in the UK Singles Chart, where it ranks as one of Springfield's biggest hits: of her solo singles only "I Just Don't Know What to Do With Myself" (No. 3) and "You Don't Have to Say You Love Me" (No. 1) outrank "I Close My Eyes..." while "I Only Want to Be with You" matches its No. 4 peak (although "I Only Want to Be With You" charted for substantially longer than "I Close My Eyes...", with eighteen weeks as opposed to twelve).

In the US, "I Close My Eyes..." was Springfield's final release on the Phillips label, Springfield having signed in June 1968 to have Atlantic Records be her US label of release as of that August; consequently the single was virtually ignored in the US, reaching No. 122 on the Bubbling Under Hot 100 Singles chart in Billboard. (The US release of "I Close My Eyes..." replaced the UK B-side "No Stranger Am I" with Springfield's rendition of "La Bamba".)

Cash Box said that it is an "exceptional lovesong with arrangements that should excite listener response" and with "classical orchestration and a brilliant performance from Dusty Springfield."

Cover versions

 Fausto Leali as "Chiudo gli occhi e conto a sei" No. 20 (Italy) (1968)
 Lola Novaković as "Zaklopim Oči I Brojim" (1968)
 Radmila Karaklajić as "Zatvaram Oči I Brojim Do Deset") (1968)
 Heidi Brühl as "Ich schließe meine Augen" (1969)
 Séverine as "Je ferme les yeux, je compte dix" (1969)
 Raya as "Syliis saat mut puristaa" (1969)
 Pasha Hristova as "Neka tozi mig da spre" (1970)
 Anni-Frid Lyngstad as "Du var främling här igår" (1970)
 Lena Valaitis as "Und ich schließe meine Augen" (1975)
 Matt Monro (1975)
 The Simon Orchestra (1979)
 Jane Aire and the Belvederes (1982)
 Tracey Ullman (1983)
 Paul Young (1983)
 Laban (1987)
 The Lover Speaks (1987)
 Udo Lindenberg as "Die Augen zu (I close my eyes and count to ten)" (1991)
 Maarit Peltoniemi as "Syliis saat mut puristaa" (2000)
 Horse McDonald (2000)
 Matt Monro Jnr and Matt Monro (2005)
 Marc Almond and Sarah Cracknell (2007)
Mari Wilson (2016)

References

1968 singles
Dusty Springfield songs
1968 songs
The Lover Speaks songs
Songs written by Clive Westlake
Philips Records singles